Tallagh may refer to:
 Tallaght, Dublin (obsolete spelling)
 Tallow, County Waterford (obsolete spelling)
 Tallow (Parliament of Ireland constituency), officially Tallagh